The 1988–89 NBA season was the Bulls' 23rd season in the National Basketball Association. During the off-season, the Bulls acquired Bill Cartwright from the New York Knicks, then later on acquired three-point specialist Craig Hodges from the Phoenix Suns in December. The Bulls struggled with a 6–8 start to the season, but later on held a 27–19 record at the All-Star break. Despite losing eight of their final ten games, the team finished fifth in the Central Division with a 47–35 record.

Michael Jordan led the league in scoring with 32.5 points, 8.0 rebounds, 8.0 assists, and 2.9 steals per game, and was named to the All-NBA First Team, NBA All-Defensive First Team, was selected for the 1989 NBA All-Star Game, and finished in second place in Most Valuable Player voting behind Magic Johnson. In addition, second-year forward Scottie Pippen showed improvement, becoming the team's starting small forward, averaging 14.4 points, 6.1 rebounds and 1.9 steals per game, while Cartwright provided the team with 12.4 points and 6.7 rebounds per game, and second-year forward Horace Grant provided with 12.0 points and 8.6 rebounds per game. Hodges contributed 10.0 points per game in 49 games with the Bulls, while Sam Vincent provided with 9.4 points and 4.8 assists per game, and John Paxson contributed 7.3 points and 3.9 assists per game.

In the Eastern Conference First Round of the playoffs, the Bulls defeated the heavily favored, and 3rd-seeded Cleveland Cavaliers in five games, and the heavily favored, and 2nd-seeded New York Knicks in six games in the Eastern Conference Semi-finals. However, they would lose to the heavily favored, and top-seeded Detroit Pistons four games to two in the Eastern Conference Finals. The Pistons would reach the NBA Finals for the second consecutive year, and defeat the defending champion Los Angeles Lakers in four straight games, winning their first ever championship.

Following the season, head coach Doug Collins was fired after three seasons with the Bulls, and Vincent left in the 1989 NBA Expansion Draft.

Draft picks

Roster

Regular season
In the 1988–89 season, Jordan again led the league in scoring, averaging 32.5 ppg on 53.8% shooting from the field. The Bulls finished with a 47–35 record, and advanced to the Eastern Conference Finals. On March 11, head coach Doug Collins moved Jordan to the point guard position. Two days later, Jordan finished with 21 points, 14 rebounds, and 14 assists in just 30 minutes of a blowout win against the Pacers. Jordan continued at point guard through the rest of the regular season.

Season standings

Record vs. opponents

Game log

Regular season

|- align="center" bgcolor="#ffcccc"
| 1
| November 4
| Detroit
| L 94–107
|
|
|
| Chicago Stadium
| 0–1
|- align="center" bgcolor="#ffcccc"
| 3
| November 8
| @ New York
| L 117–126
|
|
|
| Madison Square Garden
| 1–2
|- align="center" bgcolor="#ffcccc"
| 13
| November 29
| @ Golden State
| L 99–109
|
|
|
| Oakland–Alameda County Coliseum Arena
| 6–7

|- align="center" bgcolor="#ffcccc"
| 17
| December 7
| @ Detroit
| L 89–102
|
|
|
| The Palace of Auburn Hills
| 8–9
|- align="center" bgcolor="#ccffcc"
| 18
| December 9
| Milwaukee
| W 118–100
|
|
|
| Chicago Stadium
| 9–9
|- align="center" bgcolor="#ccffcc"
| 22
| December 17
| @ Milwaukee
| W 112–93
|
|
|
| Bradley Center
| 12–10
|- align="center" bgcolor="#ccffcc"
| 23
| December 20
| L.A. Lakers
| W 116–103
|
|
|
| Chicago Stadium
| 13–10
|- align="center" bgcolor="#ccffcc"
| 26
| December 29
| New York
| W 108–106
|
|
|
| Chicago Stadium
| 14–12

|- align="center" bgcolor="#ffcccc"
| 37
| January 21
| Phoenix
| L 107–116
|
|
|
| Chicago Stadium
| 22–15
|- align="center" bgcolor="#ffcccc"
| 41
| January 31
| Detroit
| L 98–104 (OT)
|
|
|
| Chicago Stadium
| 24–17

|- align="center" bgcolor="#ffcccc"
| 44
| February 5
| @ Detroit
| L 102–113
|
|
|
| The Palace of Auburn Hills
| 25–19
|- align="center" bgcolor="#ccffcc"
| 48
| February 16
| Milwaukee
| W 117–116
|
|
|
| Chicago Stadium
| 28–20
|- align="center" bgcolor="#ccffcc"
| 49
| February 19
| @ Milwaukee
| W 108–106
|
|
|
| Bradley Center
| 29–20

|- align="center" bgcolor="#ccffcc"
| 55
| March 3
| Milwaukee
| W 102–96
|
|
|
| Chicago Stadium
| 34–21
|- align="center" bgcolor="#ffcccc"
| 56
| March 4
| @ New York
| L 104–122
|
|
|
| Madison Square Garden
| 34–22
|- align="center" bgcolor="#ccffcc"
| 59
| March 11
| Seattle
| W 105–88
|
|
|
| Chicago Stadium
| 35–24
|- align="center" bgcolor="#ccffcc"
| 62
| March 17
| New York
| W 129–124
|
|
|
| Chicago Stadium
| 37–25
|- align="center" bgcolor="#ccffcc"
| 64
| March 21
| @ L.A. Lakers
| W 104–103
|
|
|
| Great Western Forum
| 38–26
|- align="center" bgcolor="#ccffcc"
| 65
| March 22
| @ Phoenix
| W 112–111
|
|
|
| Arizona Veterans Memorial Coliseum
| 39–26
|- align="center" bgcolor="#ccffcc"
| 67
| March 25
| @ Seattle
| W 111–110
|
|
|
| Seattle Center Coliseum
| 41–26
|- align="center" bgcolor="#ccffcc"
| 68
| March 28
| Golden State
| W 115–106
|
|
|
| Chicago Stadium
| 42–26
|- align="center" bgcolor="#ccffcc"
| 69
| March 29
| @ Milwaukee
| W 106–102
|
|
|
| Bradley Center
| 43–26

|- align="center" bgcolor="#ffcccc"
| 73
| April 6
| @ Detroit
| L 108–115
|
|
|
| The Palace of Auburn Hills
| 45–28
|- align="center" bgcolor="#ffcccc"
| 74
| April 7
| Detroit
| L 112–114 (OT)
|
|
|
| Chicago Stadium
| 45–29
|- align="center" bgcolor="#ccffcc"
| 79
| April 17
| New York
| W 104–100
|
|
|
| Chicago Stadium
| 46–33

Playoffs

|- align="center" bgcolor="#ccffcc"
| 1
| April 28
| @ Cleveland
| W 95–88
| Michael Jordan (31)
| Horace Grant (13)
| Michael Jordan (11)
| Richfield Coliseum19,312
| 1–0
|- align="center" bgcolor="#ffcccc"
| 2
| April 30
| @ Cleveland
| L 88–96
| Michael Jordan (30)
| Horace Grant (14)
| Michael Jordan (10)
| Richfield Coliseum20,273
| 1–1
|- align="center" bgcolor="#ccffcc"
| 3
| May 3
| Cleveland
| W 101–94
| Michael Jordan (44)
| Horace Grant (17)
| Michael Jordan (10)
| Chicago Stadium17,721
| 2–1
|- align="center" bgcolor="#ffcccc"
| 4
| May 5
| Cleveland
| L 105–108 (OT)
| Michael Jordan (50)
| Horace Grant (16)
| Pippen, Hodges (5)
| Chicago Stadium18,264
| 2–2
|- align="center" bgcolor="#ccffcc"
| 5
| May 7
| @ Cleveland
| W 101–100
| Michael Jordan (44)
| Scottie Pippen (10)
| Michael Jordan (6)
| Richfield Coliseum20,273
| 3–2
|-

|-
|- align="center" bgcolor="#ccffcc"
| 1
| May 9
| @ New York
| W 120–109 (OT)
| Michael Jordan (34)
| Bill Cartwright (14)
| Michael Jordan (12)
| Madison Square Garden19,591
| 1–0
|- align="center" bgcolor="#ffcccc"
| 2
| May 11
| @ New York
| L 97–114
| John Paxson (16)
| Charles Davis (9)
| Scottie Pippen (5)
| Madison Square Garden19,591
| 1–1
|- align="center" bgcolor="#ccffcc"
| 3
| May 13
| New York
| W 111–88
| Michael Jordan (40)
| Michael Jordan (15)
| Michael Jordan (9)
| Chicago Stadium18,599
| 2–1
|- align="center" bgcolor="#ccffcc"
| 4
| May 14
| New York
| W 106–93
| Michael Jordan (47)
| Michael Jordan (11)
| Scottie Pippen (8)
| Chicago Stadium18,637
| 3–1
|- align="center" bgcolor="#ffcccc"
| 5
| May 16
| @ New York
| L 114–121
| Michael Jordan (38)
| Scottie Pippen (9)
| Michael Jordan (10)
| Madison Square Garden19,591
| 3–2
|- align="center" bgcolor="#ccffcc"
| 6
| May 19
| New York
| W 113–111
| Michael Jordan (40)
| Bill Cartwright (8)
| Michael Jordan (10)
| Chicago Stadium18,676
| 4–2
|-

|-
|- align="center" bgcolor="#ccffcc"
| 1
| May 21
| @ Detroit
| W 94–88
| Michael Jordan (32)
| Jordan, Pippen (11)
| Scottie Pippen (6)
| The Palace of Auburn Hills21,454
| 1–0
|- align="center" bgcolor="#ffcccc"
| 2
| May 23
| @ Detroit
| L 91–100
| Michael Jordan (27)
| Horace Grant (20)
| John Paxson (6)
| The Palace of Auburn Hills21,454
| 1–1
|- align="center" bgcolor="#ccffcc"
| 3
| May 27
| Detroit
| W 99–97
| Michael Jordan (46)
| Scottie Pippen (8)
| Jordan, Hodges (5)
| Chicago Stadium18,676
| 2–1
|- align="center" bgcolor="#ffcccc"
| 4
| May 29
| Detroit
| L 80–86
| Michael Jordan (23)
| Horace Grant (12)
| Craig Hodges (5)
| Chicago Stadium18,676
| 2–2
|- align="center" bgcolor="#ffcccc"
| 5
| May 31
| @ Detroit
| L 85–94
| Craig Hodges (19)
| Bill Cartwright (12)
| Michael Jordan (9)
| The Palace of Auburn Hills21,454
| 2–3
|- align="center" bgcolor="#ffcccc"
| 6
| June 2
| Detroit
| L 94–103
| Michael Jordan (32)
| Horace Grant (13)
| Michael Jordan (13)
| Chicago Stadium18,676
| 2–4
|-

Player stats

Regular season

Playoffs

Awards and honors
 Craig Hodges, NBA All-Star Weekend Three-Point Shootout Winner
 Michael Jordan, All-NBA First Team
 Michael Jordan, NBA All-Defensive First Team
 Michael Jordan, NBA All-Star Game

References

 Bulls on Database Basketball
 Bulls on Basketball Reference

Chicago Bulls seasons
Chic
Chicago Bulls
Chicago Bulls
1980s in Chicago
1989 in Illinois